The 2002 season of the Toppserien, the highest women's football (soccer) league in Norway, began on 20 April 2002 and ended on 26 October 2002.

18 games were played with 3 points given for wins and 1 for draws. Number nine and ten were relegated, while the two top teams from the First Division were promoted.

Kolbotn won the league.

League table

Top goalscorers
 22 goals:
  Marianne Pettersen, Asker
 19 goals:
  Kjersti Thun, Asker
  Christine Bøe Jensen, Kolbotn
  Elene Moseby, Team Strømmen
 13 goals:
  Brit Sandaune, Trondheims-Ørn
 12 goals:
  Solveig Gulbrandsen, Kolbotn
 10 goals:
  Ingrid Camilla Fosse Sæthre, Arna-Bjørnar
  Bente Musland, Arna-Bjørnar
  Lene Espedal, Klepp
  Heidi Pedersen, Trondheims-Ørn
 9 goals:
  Anita Eftedal, Larvik
  Kristine Edner, Røa
  Trine Rønning, Trondheims-Ørn

Promotion and relegation
 Sandviken and Byåsen were relegated to the First Division.
 Liungen and Fløya were promoted from the First Division.

References
League table
Fixtures
Goalscorers

Toppserien seasons
Top level Norwegian women's football league seasons
1
Nor
Nor